Ensenada  is a city and port in Buenos Aires Province, Argentina, located around the Ensenada de Barragán. It is the capital of Ensenada Partido, and
together with Berisso Partido they are the main suburbs of the Gran La Plata conurbation around the provincial capital of La Plata.

The port of Ensenada carries grain and beef exports, as well as industrial shipments. The volume traded has been recently growing at the expense of the Buenos Aires port, located 60 km to the north-west.

As Buenos Aires city authorities are considering repurposing the port of Buenos Aires as a passenger-only facility, the volume at Ensenada (as well as that of the ports in Campana and Bahía Blanca) is slated to experience further growth.

References

 
Ensenada website  
Todo Ensenada Portal 

Populated places in Buenos Aires Province
Port settlements in Argentina
Populated places established in 1801
La Plata
Populated coastal places in Argentina
Cities in Argentina
Argentina